Breibukta is a bay at the southern side of Kongsøya in Kong Karls Land, Svalbard. It stretches from Kapp Altmann via Helgoland Island to Vestre Tømmerpynten at the headland Tømmerneset.

References

Bays of Svalbard
Kongsøya